Bidadari Mencari Sayap is a 2020 Indonesian melodrama film directed and co-written by Aria Kusumadewa. The film stars Leony and Rizky Hanggono.

Premise
Reza (Hanggono) and Angela (Leony) are trapped in differences in beliefs and culture. Reza, who is a Muslim and of Arab descent, marries Angela, who is of Chinese descent. Even though Angela has decided to convert to Islam, Reza's family still does not accept her presence.

Cast

Release
Disney+ Hotstar acquired the distribution rights of the film, releasing it on 2 October 2020.

Accolades

References

External links
 Bidadari Mencari Sayap on Hotstar
 

2020 drama films
Indonesian drama films
Melodrama films
2020s Indonesian-language films